Ville Järvinen (born January 1, 1997) is a Finnish professional ice hockey defenceman. He is currently playing for IPK of the Finnish Mestis.

Järvinen made his Liiga debut playing with Ilves during the 2015–16 Liiga season. In 2017 he signed for fellow Liiga side KooKoo.

References

External links

1997 births
Living people
Finnish ice hockey defencemen
Iisalmen Peli-Karhut players
Imatran Ketterä players
KooKoo players
KOOVEE players
Ilves players
Lempäälän Kisa players
Ice hockey people from Tampere